Balham is a district of London, England.

Balham may also refer to:

Balaam, a Biblical figure
Balham, Ardennes, a commune in France
Balham station, a railway and tube station in Balham, London